The 2013 Aegon International was a combined men's and women's tennis tournament played on outdoor grass courts. It was the 39th edition of the event for the women and the 5th edition for the men. It was classified as a WTA Premier tournament on the 2013 WTA Tour and as an ATP World Tour 250 series on the 2013 ATP World Tour. The event took place at the Devonshire Park Lawn Tennis Club in Eastbourne, United Kingdom from 17 June through 22 June 2013.

Points and prize money

Point distribution

Prize money

* per team

ATP singles main-draw entrants

Seeds

 1 Seedings are based on the rankings as of 10 June 2013.

Other entrants
The following players received wildcards into the main draw:
  Kyle Edmund
  Milos Raonic
  James Ward

The following players received entry from the qualifying draw:
  James Blake
  Kenny de Schepper
  Ryan Harrison
  Guillaume Rufin

Withdrawals
Before the tournament
  Thomaz Bellucci

ATP doubles main-draw entrants

Seeds

 Rankings are as of 10 June 2013.

Other entrants
The following pairs received wildcards into the doubles main draw:
  Jamie Delgado /  James Ward
  Kyle Edmund /  Sean Thornley

WTA singles main-draw entrants

Seeds

 1 Rankings are as of 10 June 2013.

Other entrants
The following players received wildcards into the main draw:
 Samantha Stosur
 Johanna Konta
 Elena Baltacha

The following players received entry from the qualifying draw:
 Yuliya Beygelzimer
 Jamie Hampton
 Kristýna Plíšková
 Olga Puchkova

Withdrawals
Before the tournament
  Sara Errani
  Yaroslava Shvedova
  Sloane Stephens

Retirements
  Tamira Paszek (thigh injury)
  Marion Bartoli (viral illness)

WTA doubles main-draw entrants

Seeds

1 Rankings are as of 10 June 2013.

Other entrants
The following pairs received wildcards into the doubles main draw:
  Petra Kvitová /  Yanina Wickmayer
  Anne Keothavong /  Samantha Murray

Champions

Men's singles

 Feliciano López def.  Gilles Simon, 7–6(7–2), 6–7(5–7), 6–0
 It was the third title of his career for Lopez, his first since 2010 and his first in a grass court tournament.

Women's singles

 Elena Vesnina def.  Jamie Hampton, 6–2, 6–1
 It was Vesnina second title of the year and the second of her career, her first being at Hobart International.

Men's doubles

 Alexander Peya /  Bruno Soares def.  Colin Fleming /  Jonathan Marray, 3–6, 6–3, [10–8]

Women's doubles

 Nadia Petrova /  Katarina Srebotnik def.  Monica Niculescu /  Klára Zakopalová, 6–3, 6–3

References

External links
 Website

2013 WTA Tour
2013 ATP World Tour
June 2013 sports events in the United Kingdom
2013
2013 in English tennis